A list of films produced in Brazil in 1954:

See also
1954 in Brazil

External links
Brazilian films of 1954 at the Internet Movie Database

Brazil
1954
Films